"So Much Love" is a song by rock artist The Rocket Summer.  It was the lead single off his third studio album Do You Feel, released in 2007.  The song charted in the Top 13 on R&R magazine's Christian Hit Radio chart as of December 15, 2007.

Music video
The music video consisted of Bryce Avary singing and playing the piano, with a series of people climbing out of grand piano and onto the dance floor.  The video later shows Avary switching back and forth between the piano and lead guitar, as he does in his live performances.

References

2007 singles
Music videos directed by Shane Drake
2007 songs
Island Records singles